Lord Astor is a title that can refer to the male holder of one of the following peerages. 
Baron Astor of Hever
Viscount Astor

See also
 Lady Astor (disambiguation)